Shadrach Bond (November 24, 1773 – April 12, 1832) was a representative from the Illinois Territory to the United States Congress. In 1818, he was elected Governor of Illinois, becoming the new state's first chief executive. In an example of American politics during the Era of Good Feelings, Bond was elected to both positions without opposition.

Early life
Bond was born in 1773 in Frederick, Maryland.  He had twelve Illinois Country connections through his uncle, also, named Shadrach Bond, a scout with George Rogers Clark's Illinois Regiment in the American Revolutionary War. Because they held some of the same offices in Illinois, the two Bonds are sometimes confused; the uncle is usually known as Shadrach Bond, Sr. The young Bond learned from his uncle of the rich farmland of the Illinois Territory, and emigrated to the American Bottom, an especially fertile section of the Mississippi River basin. Bond would be an Illinois farmer for the remainder of his life. Shadrach Bond was made a Freemason in Temple Lodge No. 26, Reisters Town, Baltimore County, Maryland. When he moved to Illinois, he became a member of lodge The Western Star Lodge No. 107, Kaskaskia, Territory of Indiana on December 27, 1806. Bond was elected Illinois' first Grand Master when the first Illinois Grand Lodge was constituted on December 11, 1822.

Political career
A Democratic-Republican, Bond was elected to the Indiana Territorial Council. After Illinois Territory was organized, he was elected to the United States House of Representatives. When Illinois was admitted to the Union, Bond was elected the first governor.

As Illinois's first governor, Bond led a new state that had sterling prospects but almost no transportation infrastructure or cash in hand. Bond made transportation his top priority as governor. Because the state had almost no money, the General Assembly passed and Bond signed  bills to build privately operated toll roads and bridges, headed by a road connecting the state's first capital, Kaskaskia on the Mississippi River, with what was then the state's largest city, Shawneetown, on the Ohio River. The road was built and eventually taken over by the state of Illinois as a state highway. After almost two centuries of improvements, much of it is now part of Illinois Route 13.

Bond was less successful in his advocacy for a canal that would connect Lake Michigan and the Illinois River (the Illinois and Michigan Canal). The canal was eventually built in the 1840s, long after Bond had left office.

Governor Bond was deeply concerned about arson. The Illinois criminal law made arsonists eligible for the death penalty, along with persons guilty of rape and murder.  The governor was by no means exclusively concerned with appearing to be tough on crime, however.  He took steps to abolish the whipping post and pillory for misdemeanor offenses.

Bond's most controversial act was his attempt to veto an act passed by the General Assembly to create a non-capitalized State Bank of Illinois. The bank was ready to issue banknotes based on the prospect of future economic growth within Illinois. Bond considered this dishonorable and felt that there should be no banks chartered by the state government of Illinois until the State had enough specie (gold and silver coin) to support the value of its banknotes.  The undercapitalized bank was chartered anyway, and promptly went bankrupt, justifying Bond's concerns.

Retirement
After Bond's single term as governor, he returned to his Kaskaskia farm.  He was no longer in the center of Illinois politics, as the General Assembly had moved the state capital from Kaskaskia to Vandalia. President James Monroe appointed Bond chief record keeper of the Kaskaskia land office, an important job in a land-hungry frontier state. As a respected local leader, Bond also helped to raise the local share of funding to secure the construction of the state's first penitentiary in Alton. In the early 1830s Bond was elected Master of his Masonic Lodge.

Death
Shadrach Bond died of pneumonia on his farm at Kaskaskia in 1832. He is interred in Evergreen Cemetery in Chester, and his grave is marked by the Governor Bond State Memorial. In September 2008, his obelisk – the tallest and most prominent monument in the cemetery – was toppled by Hurricane Ike.

Honors
In 1817, Illinois Territory named the newly created Bond County for Shadrach Bond. The honor was bestowed for Bond's service as a congressional delegate; he had not yet become governor. Governor Bond Lake in Greenville, Illinois is also named in honor of Bond.

References

Solon J. Buck, Illinois in 1818, at Thayer's American history site
Robert P. Howard, Mostly Good and Competent Men
Theodore Calvin Pease, The Frontier State 1818–1848

|-

1773 births
1832 deaths
19th-century American politicians
American slave owners
Deaths from pneumonia in Illinois
Delegates to the United States House of Representatives from Illinois Territory
Democratic-Republican Party state governors of the United States
Governors of Illinois
Illinois Democratic-Republicans
Members of the Indiana Territorial Legislature
People from Kaskaskia, Illinois
Politicians from Frederick, Maryland